The 2004 United States presidential election in Alaska took place on November 2, 2004, and was part of the 2004 United States presidential election. Voters chose 3 representatives, or electors to the Electoral College, who voted for president and vice president.

Alaska was won by incumbent President George W. Bush by a 25.6% margin of victory. Prior to the election, all 12 news organizations considered this a state Bush would win, or otherwise considered as a safe red state. It has voted for a Republican presidential nominee in every presidential election since statehood, except for 1964. As of 2020, this is the last time anyone received over 60% of the vote in Alaska. This is also the most recent time that Bethel Census Area, Kusilvak Census Area, and Nome Census Area voted for the Republican candidate.

Primaries 
2004 Alaska Democratic presidential primary

Campaign

Predictions
There were 12 news organizations who made state-by-state predictions of the election. Here are their last predictions before election day.

Polling

Only one pre-election poll was conducted in this state. Bush won the poll with 57% to 30%.

Fundraising
Bush raised $263,269. Kerry raised $169,533.

Advertising and visits
Neither campaign advertised or visited this state during the fall campaign.

Analysis 
The Democratic presidential ticket though did better here in 2004 compared to 2000, narrowing the Republican advantage from around 31 percentage points in 2000 to approximately 25 percentage points in 2004. John Kerry obtained nearly 36 percent of the vote, approximately 8 percentage points (or 32,021 votes) more than Al Gore's showing of around 28 percent in 2000. In comparison, incumbent President George W. Bush only increased his vote in Alaska by around 2 percent (or 23,491 votes) from nearly 59 percent in 2000 to approximately 61 percent in 2004.

Results

Boroughs and census areas that flipped from Republican to Democratic 
Juneau
Sitka
Skagway
Hoonah–Angoon Census Area (largest town: Hoonah)

Boroughs and census areas that flipped from Democratic to Republican 
Bethel (largest town: Bethel)

By congressional district
Due to the state's low population, only one congressional district is allocated. This district, called the At-Large district because it covers the entire state, is thus equivalent to the statewide election results.

Electors 

Technically the voters of Alaska cast their ballots for electors: representatives to the Electoral College. Alaska is allocated 3 electors because it has 1 congressional districts and 2 senators. All candidates who appear on the ballot or qualify to receive write-in votes must submit a list of 3 electors, who pledge to vote for their candidate and his or her running mate. Whoever wins the majority of votes in the state is awarded all 3 electoral votes. Their chosen electors then vote for president and vice president. Although electors are pledged to their candidate and running mate, they are not obligated to vote for them. An elector who votes for someone other than his or her candidate is known as a faithless elector.

The electors of each state and the District of Columbia met on December 13, 2004, to cast their votes for president and vice president. The Electoral College itself never meets as one body. Instead the electors from each state and the District of Columbia met in their respective capitols.

The following were the members of the Electoral College from the state. All were pledged to and voted for George W. Bush and Dick Cheney.

 Gloria J. Tokar
 Frederick H. Hahn
 Roberly R. Waldron

See also
United States presidential elections in Alaska

References

Alaska
2004
Presidential